The Crow: City of Angels is a 1996 American superhero film directed by Tim Pope from a screenplay by David S. Goyer. It is a sequel to the 1994 film The Crow and the second installment in The Crow film series.

Plot
In Los Angeles, drug kingpin Judah Earl murders mechanic Ashe Corven and his eight-year-old son Danny after they witness a gang of Judah's henchmen murdering a fellow drug dealer, with his gang dumping Ashe and Danny's bodies into the harbor.

Sarah from The Crow is now an adult, working in a tattoo parlor by day and painting surreal images of death and resurrection in her apartment at night. She is haunted by disturbing dreams about Ashe and Danny. After a day's work in the tattoo parlor, Sarah is visited in her apartment by a large crow as she contemplates a ring that Eric Draven gave her.

Sarah follows the crow to the harbor at night on All Saints' Day, and witnesses Ashe's resurrection and frantic escape from his watery grave before taking him to her apartment. When Sarah tells Ashe he is dead, he panics and runs screaming into the night, ending up at his own home, where he relives the final moments of his life.

Sarah arrives there to find Ashe brooding, and she explains that the Crow resurrected him so that he can exact revenge on the criminals who killed him and Danny. Guided by the crow, Ashe starts killing Judah's henchmen, one by one. Ashe first visits Spider-Monkey in a drug warehouse and interrogates him as to who else was involved in the murders before killing him by blowing up the building. Another of Judah's lackeys, Nemo, is spending the night at a peeping booth. Ashe appears in the booth and kills him, leaving a doll stuffed in his pants and a paper crow in his mouth.

Judah has employed a blind prophetess named Sybil who is able to ascertain Ashe's link to Sarah and to the crow that is the source of his powers. Judah captures Sarah in order to draw Ashe to him and steal his power.

One of the murderers, Kali, goes to Sarah's apartment to draw Ashe out. While battling her, Ashe realizes that Kali is the one who killed Danny; enraged, he throws her against a wall that breaks her leg, and then out a window to her death, leaving a crow-shaped blood pattern. Ashe then pursues Judah's right-hand-man, Curve, in a motorcycle chase. Ashe shoots Curve's motorcycle, which blows up and throws Curve onto the road. Ashe then drags Curve into the nearby river, leaving him to die as parishioners cast down flower petals in the shape of a crow.

During the Day of the Dead festival, Judah captures the crow and impales its wings with knives before killing it. He then ingests the crow's blood, stealing Ashe's power. Suddenly mortal, Ashe nearly dies from the shock, but is revived after seeing a vision of Danny telling him to keep fighting. Ashe attempts to rescue Sarah by seeking out Judah in his lair, an abandoned church. Judah overpowers the weakened Ashe in the ensuing fight, tying a rope around him and savagely whipping him, intending to hang him.

Sarah rushes up and stabs Judah in the forehead, causing Judah to drop Ashe. Judah pulls out the knife and starts moving toward Ashe. When Sarah intervenes, Judah stabs her in the stomach. Ashe gets up and impales Judah on a metal pipe, which fails to kill him. Ashe calls upon a murder of crows that devour Judah. Sarah dies from her stab wound, a tableau reminiscent of a painting she completed earlier. Ashe returns to death, knowing that he can rest in peace with Sarah, and his son.

Cast
 Vincent Pérez as Ashe Corven / The Crow
 Mia Kirshner as Sarah Mohr
 Richard Brooks as Judah Earl
 Thuy Trang as Kali
 Iggy Pop as "Curve"
 Thomas Jane as "Nemo"
 Vincent Castellanos as "Spider Monkey"
 Eric Acosta as Danny Corven
 Beverley Mitchell as Grace
 Ian Dury as Noah
 Tracey Ellis as Sybil
 Alan Gelfant as Bassett
 Kerry Rossall as Zeke
 Deftones as Themselves

Music

Reception

Box office
The Crow: City of Angels opened at number 1 at the U.S. and Canada box office grossing $9,785,111 during its opening weekend, a record for the Labor Day Weekend. Its weekend accounted for 54.6% of its total gross. It also opened at number 1 in the UK. The final US and Canadian gross was $17.9 million.

Critical response
On Rotten Tomatoes the film has an 11% approval rating based on 35 reviews, with an average rating of 3.4/10. The site's consensus states: "The Crow: City of Angels is a sloppy pretender that captures neither the mood nor energy of the original."

Joe Leydon of Variety called it "Stunningly awful." 
Owen Gleiberman of Entertainment Weekly gave it grade "D" and wrote: "Even for teens hooked on the grandiloquence of death-metal masochism, the movie may seem closer to an endless Sunday in church."

Home media

The film's Blu-ray that was released by Echo Bridge Entertainment has been criticized as not being up to high-definition standards. It was further criticized for being erroneously labeled as 1080p when the film was, in fact, presented in 1080i.

The film was released on VHS on December 3, 1996. In 1998, the film was released on DVD. In 2001, a collector's edition was released, labeled "exclusive Director's Cut", which restored 11 minutes of extended footage and included two featurettes and an audio commentary.

The film was re-released in 2011 by Echo Bridge Home Entertainment as a double feature, paired up with The Crow: Wicked Prayer. The only special feature was the widescreen format. There was also a single feature release under the same company.

The film was released on Blu-ray in May 2011.

The film was released as a part of a boxset with The Crow: Salvation in the UK with 1080p picture and DTS-MA 5.1 sound. The only special features were 2 featurettes from the collector's edition.

On September 11, 2012, Echo Bridge released another Blu-ray release of the film (once again, a double feature with The Crow: Wicked Prayer). It was already being sold at Walmart stores before its official release date had been reached. This version contained bonus material not present in the original Blu-ray release.

On October 7, 2014, it was released on DVD by Lionsgate in a triple feature edition with the other two Crow sequels.

Marketing
The screenplay for City of Angels was adapted into a novel by Chet Williamson as well as a three-issue comic book series published by Kitchen Sink Press. Both feature the original ending of the story, in which Ashe wanders the earth as an undead spirit.

A video game tie-in The Crow: City of Angels was made for the PlayStation, Sega Saturn, and Microsoft Windows. The game was to be initially released around the same time as the film but instead released in early 1997.

References

External links

 
 
 

1996 films
1990s fantasy action films
1990s superhero films
1996 directorial debut films
American fantasy action films
American sequel films
American ghost films
Films set in Los Angeles
Films shot in Los Angeles
American vigilante films
The Crow films
Films directed by Tim Pope
Films with screenplays by David S. Goyer
Films scored by Graeme Revell
Miramax films
Dimension Films films
Resurrection in film
1990s ghost films
Supernatural action films
1990s vigilante films
1990s English-language films
1990s American films